The 2003 Pilot Pen Tennis was a women's tennis tournament played on outdoor hard courts. It was the 21st edition of the Pilot Pen Tennis and was part of the Tier II Series of the 2003 WTA Tour. It took place at the Cullman-Heyman Tennis Center in New Haven, United States, from August 17 through August 23, 2003. Third-seeded Jennifer Capriati won the singles title and earned $96,000 first-prize money as well as 195 ranking points.

Finals

Singles
  Jennifer Capriati defeated  Lindsay Davenport 6–2, 4–0 ret.

Doubles
  Virginia Ruano Pascual /  Paola Suárez defeated  Alicia Molik /  Magüi Serna 7–6(8–6), 6–3

References

External links
 ITF tournament edition details
 Tournament draws

Pilot Pen Tennis
2003
Pilot Pen Tennis
Pilot Pen
Pilot Pen Tennis
2003 Pilot Pen Tennis